Indigenous education in Canada refers to education in Canada for First Nations, Inuit, and Métis, also known collectively as Indigenous peoples in Canada, per Section 35 of the Constitution Act, 1982 the "Aboriginal peoples of Canada", or occasionally as F.N.M.I. students (First Nations, Métis, and Inuit).

Due to Canada's colonial history and federal constitution indigenous education is a shared jurisdiction between Indian bands, :territorial governments, and the federal government.

Educational attainment has historically been significantly lower for indigenous peoples in Canada compared to the non-indigenous population, and this is considered one of Canada's major social problems.  Significant debate and controversy surround the issue of how to improve indigenous education outcomes.  In particular there is controversy over how to interpret and respond to the history of the Canadian Indian residential school system, which was imposed on indigenous students from the late 19th to the late 20th century.  Debate also surrounds issues of funding, access (especially in remote communities), cultural appropriateness, language revival, and accommodations for FNMI students in non-indigenous school systems.

Higher education 
The educational attainment gap between indigenous and non-indigenous Canadians in trades programs and college diplomas has narrowed considerably since 2006, and was nearly gone by 2016.  However, the gap in university degree attainment was still quite large. Among non-indigenous Canadians, 45% had a university degree, compared to just 22% of self-identified indigenous people, 23% of First Nations people living on-reserve, and only 15% of First Nations people living on-reserve.

References 

Education in Canada
Indigenous peoples in Canada
Indigenous education